The 1970–71 FIBA European Champions Cup was the 14th installment of the European top-tier level professional basketball club competition FIBA European Champions Cup (now called EuroLeague). The Final was held at the Arena Deurne, in Antwerp, Belgium, on April 8, 1971. It was won by CSKA Moscow, who defeated Ignis Varese, by a result of 67–53.

Competition system

 27 teams (European national domestic league champions, plus the then current title holders), playing in a tournament system, played knock-out rounds on a home and away basis. The aggregate score of both games decided the winner.
 The eight teams qualified for the Quarterfinals were divided into two groups of four. Every team played against the other three in its group in consecutive home-and-away matches, so that every two of these games counted as a single win or defeat (point difference being a decisive factor there). In case of a tie between two or more teams after the group stage, the following criteria were used: 1) one-to-one games between the teams; 2) basket average; 3) individual wins and defeats.
 The group winners and the runners-up of the Quarterfinal Group Stage qualified for the Semifinals. The final was played at a predetermined venue.

First round

|}

*FIBA cancelled this match and declared İTÜ winner as Partizani Tirana refused to play in Turkey due to an outbreak of cholera in this country.

**Fiat Stars and ÍR withdrew before the first leg, so AŠK Olimpija and Olympique Antibes received a forfeit (2–0) in both their games.

Second round

|}

Quarterfinals group stage
The quarterfinals were played with a round-robin system, in which every Two Game series (TGS) constituted as one game for the record.

Semifinals

|}

Final
April 8, Arena Deurne, Antwerp

|}

Awards

FIBA European Champions Cup Finals Top Scorer
 Sergei Belov ( CSKA Moscow)

References

External links
 1970–71 FIBA European Champions Cup
 1970–71 FIBA European Champions Cup
 Champions Cup 1970–71 Line-ups and Stats

EuroLeague seasons
FIBA